Pautaines-Augeville is a former commune in the Haute-Marne department in north-eastern France. On 28 February 2013, Pautaines-Augeville was annexed by the commune of Épizon.

References

Former communes of Haute-Marne